Szczuki  is a village in the administrative district of Gmina Płoniawy-Bramura, within Maków County, Masovian Voivodeship, in east-central Poland.

The village has a population of 1,000.

References

Szczuki